Rolla Wells (June 1, 1856November 30, 1944), also called "Rollo", was an American politician.  He served two terms as Mayor of St. Louis, Missouri, was named an officer of the Democratic National Committee in the 1912 Wilson campaign, and served as Governor of the St. Louis branch of the Federal Reserve Bank.

Biography 
Born in St. Louis, Missouri on June 1, 1856 in St. Louis Missouri to Erastus Wells and Isabella Bowman Henry Wells. His father Erastus was a representative from Missouri.  He was educated at Washington University in St. Louis and Princeton University, and later in life received honorary MA degrees from both institutions.

His name first appears in print in the on October 9, 1892 edition of New York Times, where he is described as the "President of the Fair Association" for St. Louis. In the March 18, 1893 edition, he is quoted as the "President of the Jockey Club" of St. Louis; and the July 16, 1896 edition includes the statement "Rolla Wells, President of the Jefferson Club, resigned last night, announcing that he could not support the Chicago platform" (the "Chicago platform" referring to William Jennings Bryan).

On April 1, 1901, the New York Times reported that "One of the hardest fought municipal campaigns in the history of St Louis closed to-night" and that the candidates were "Rolla Wells, Democratic; George W. Parker, Republican; Chauncey I. Filley, Good Government; Lee Meriwether, Public Ownership; Leon Greenbaum, Social-Democrat, and Lewis C. Fry, Socialist-Labor."

Wells was Mayor of St. Louis for eight years, during which time the World's Fair and the Olympics were held there.  Some of his major accomplishment included overseeing the construction of a new city hall in 1903, the paving of many city streets, and—in 1904—making the city's drinking water run clear for the first time.  In 1912, Governor Woodrow Wilson, Democratic candidate for President, named Wells treasurer of the Democratic National Committee, where he served until Wilbur W. Marsh was appointed in 1916.

Around 1914 to 1916, Wells was named Governor of the Federal Reserve Bank of St. Louis. He held the position until 1919, when he was named Receiver for the United Railways of St. Louis.

He died on November 30, 1944 and was buried at Bellefontaine Cemetery.

Family life
His first wife, Jennie Howard Parker, died in 1917.  He later wed Mrs. Carlotta Clark Church, widow of Alonzo Church, on November 18, 1923 in St. Louis.

References

Publications 
 Episodes of My Life (1933)

Further reading

External links 
 Rolla Wells at the St. Louis Public Library: St. Louis Mayors website.
 Rolla Wells, Mayor of St. Louis The World Today Magazine 1906

1856 births
1944 deaths
Mayors of St. Louis
Washington University in St. Louis alumni
Democratic National Committee treasurers